Control region may refer to:

 mtDNA control region, an area of the mitochondrial genome which is non-coding DNA.
 Locus control region, a long-range cis-regulatory element that enhances expression of linked genes at ectopic chromatin sites.
Internal control region, a sequence of DNA located with the coding region of eukaryotic genes that binds regulatory elements such as activators or repressors.
Processor Control Region, a Windows kernel mode data structure that contains information about the current processor.